Umbrella is the debut album by Japanese R&B singer Shota Shimizu, released on November 26, 2008 in Japan. The album ranked at #2 and sold 56,442 units in its first week. After eight weeks, it had sold 115,863 copies.

Track listing
All songs written by Shota Shimizu.
 "Diggin' on U"
 "Home"
 "With You"
 "My Treasure"
 "One Last Kiss"
 "Love Story"
 "Rainy Day's Morning"
 "Unhappy"
 "Lovin U"
 "Aishiteru"
 "My Love"
 "Soulmate"
 "Sorezore"
 "Home" (Hip hop remix) (Japanese bonus track)

Release history

References

2008 albums
2009 albums